The Borăscu is a right tributary of the river Jilț in Romania. It flows into the Jilț near the village Borăscu.

References

Rivers of Romania
Rivers of Gorj County